Manto is a municipality in the Honduran department of Olancho.

Demographics
At the time of the 2013 Honduras census, Manto municipality had a population of 9,625. Of these, 95.62% were Mestizo, 3.29% White, 0.57% Indigenous and 0.51% Black or Afro-Honduran.

References

Municipalities of the Olancho Department